Alex Shapiro (born January 11, 1962) is a composer of acoustic and electroacoustic music favoring combinations of modal harmonies with chromatic ones, and often emphasizing strong pulse and rhythm.

Shapiro was born in New York City. She was educated at the Juilliard School and Manhattan School of Music as a student of Ursula Mamlok and John Corigliano.

The majority of Shapiro's catalog is chamber works, and since 2008 she has also composed several commissions for symphonic wind band, several of which include the use of prerecorded electronics. Performance highlights include Shapiro's Sonata for Piano at the Beijing Modern Music Festival in China, For My Father from her Piano Suite No. 1: The Resonance of Childhood on the MoMA of New York series The American Season in Berlin, Desert Tide premiered at the Stellenbosch New Music and Art Festival in South Africa, Trio for Clarinet, Violin and Piano at the National Museum of Women in the Arts in Washington, D.C., and At the Abyss performed at Carnegie Hall in New York. Other notable works in her catalog include Deep, a work for contrabassoon and electronics; a flute quartet, Bioplasm;  a string quintet, Current Events, and Paper Cut, for wind band, electronics and printer paper, commissioned by the American Composers Forum BandQuest series in 2010.

Shapiro is an active participant in the U.S. art music community. She currently serves on the board of directors of the American Music Center and the MacDowell Colony and sits on the ASCAP Symphony & Concert Committee; in 2010 she was elected as the concert music composer representative to the ASCAP Board of Review. She is the recent president of the board of directors of The American Composers Forum of Los Angeles and Moderator of the  Los Angeles Composers Salon series from 2000 to the present, for which she has interviewed over 100 composers. Shapiro testified in September 2009 on a Federal Communications Commission panel hearing in Washington, D.C., about broadband access and digital rights issues.

Shapiro served on the board of directors of the American Civil Liberties Union of Southern California from 1990 to 1996, including a term as the 30,000-member affiliate's vice president. She is the recipient of three awards from the ACLU honoring her activism, including being named the 1993 Chapter Activist of the Year.

Articles and reviews
"American Composer: Alex Shapiro", Kyle Gann, Chamber Music, May/June, 2008

External links 
Alex Shapiro website
ASCAP Audio Portrait, September 2008  (interview)
New Music Box: The Economy of Exposure (article)
New Music Box: As Important as the Printing Press (article)
New Music Box: Composing Your Happiness (article)
New Music Box: Neo-Romanticism (article)
Kalvos and Damian's New Music Bazaar (radio interview)
All in Good Measure: New Music, New Thoughts (podcast interview)

Manhattan School of Music alumni
20th-century classical composers
21st-century classical composers
American women classical composers
American classical composers
1962 births
Living people
21st-century American composers
20th-century American women musicians
20th-century American composers
21st-century American women musicians
20th-century women composers
21st-century women composers